Carmen González may refer to:

Carmen González (singer), Afro-Ecuadorian singer
Carmen González (chef), Puerto Rican chef